Heron Cross is a suburb situated between Blurton and Fenton, in Stoke on Trent. It has a pharmacy, two corner shops, two pubs, two hairdressers, a school, a park and a pot bank. It has two main streets, Grove Road and Heron Street.
Heron Cross is a home to about 1,000 people.

The school, Heron Cross Primary School is a primary school for people aged 3/4 to 10/11 (nursery to y6). Mrs Shenton is the current headteacher. Her time there extends from September 2008 to the present.

Areas of Stoke-on-Trent
Villages in Staffordshire